Nepali Myanmar–Nepal relations refers to bilateral foreign relations between Myanmar and Nepal.

Myanmar–Nepal relations were officially established on 19 March 1960. Nepal has an embassy in Yangon and Myanmar has an embassy in Kathmandu.

See also
 Rohingya refugees in Nepal

References

Further reading 

 

 
Bilateral relations of Nepal
Nepal